A combination car was a vehicle that could serve either as a hearse or as an ambulance, and had the capability of being swapped between those roles without much difficulty. This hybrid usage of the cars reflects an era when funeral homes offered emergency ambulance service in addition to their primary trade, especially in smaller towns and rural areas.

Combination cars were often built on a Cadillac Commercial Chassis and were customized by coachbuilders such as Superior, Miller-Meteor, Hess & Eisenhardt and Cotner-Bevington.



Design features 

Combination cars often include:
 Flashing lights (mounted or concealed) or a siren. Some cars used rotating roof beacons that could flash either yellow lights in processional mode, or both red and yellow lights in emergency response mode. Alternatively, a hole on the roof was often supplied where a beacon could be bolted on an intermittent basis, with a wire passing through to the driver's compartment where it could be plugged in when needed.
 Two-way radio
 Gurney (stretcher) or a casket. The presence of ambulance technology made combos useful in the first call role, as a gurney is also used in that function.
 Foldable seats on one side in the rear compartment where a first-aid person can sit while looking after a patient on their way to the hospital
 A cabinet where first-aid supplies can be stored

Decline 

Usage of passenger car or station wagon derived vehicles as ambulances began to decline in the early 1970s and became impractical in the US around 1979. This was due to new federal regulations increasing the required equipment and interior space, as well as a major downsizing of the passenger cars upon which ambulances and funeral cars were previously built.

In popular culture
 In the first 2 Ghostbusters movies and Ghostbusters: Afterlife, the Ectomobile (Ecto-1), is a modified 1959 Cadillac Miller-Meteor combination coach. In the 2016 reboot Ecto-1 is a modified 1984 Cadillac Funeral Coach instead.
 1980's The Hearse and 1990's The Ambulance star combination cars in the form of a 1952 Packard Funeral Coach hearse and a 1973 Cadillac Miller-Meteor Lifeliner ambulance respectively.
 Sally Sykebil, (lit. "Sally Ambulance") one of the main characters in the 1993–1997 Norwegian children's TV series Pelle Politibil, is a combination car ambulance.

References 

Car body styles
Commercial vehicles
Ambulances
Hearses